Little Angels High School is a secondary (high) school in the Rajbagh area of Srinagar, Jammu and Kashmir. It was established in 1992 and is affiliated to Jammu and Kashmir State Board of School Education.

Medium of education
The school uses English as a medium of education. Every student must speak in English while on the school campus.

School organization
The school has four houses, named after the colours red, blue, green, and yellow, for both the boys department of the school and as well for girls' department.

Activities

 Annual cross country run from class I-X
 Summer camps for class (4th through 9th) and with (trekking for class X only)
 Excursions class I to X
 Debates and seminars
 Interhouse football and cricket

Publications
 Yearbook "Bud Magazine"

Affiliations

The school is affiliated to Jammu and Kashmir State Board of School Education.

References

1992 establishments in Jammu and Kashmir
Educational institutions established in 1992
High schools and secondary schools in Jammu and Kashmir
Christian schools in Jammu and Kashmir
Schools in Srinagar